Uhersko, in 1946–1993 Yablunivka is a village (selo) in Stryi Raion, Lviv Oblast, of Western Ukraine.

Geography
It belongs to Stryi urban hromada, one of the hromadas of Ukraine. The village is located near the Highway M06 and is along the Stryi River.

History
The first record for archival documents about the village Uhersko refers to 1176. The document mentions that Uhersko existed in Ancient Russ State. The name of villages has changed from the initial Uhryny on Uhersko, Yablunivka and again Uhersko.

Economy
In territory of village there are a number of industrial enterprises – distillery (1911); feed mill (1972); bakery (1967).

References

External links
village Uhersko
Угерська сільська рада

Villages in Stryi Raion